Eddie Carvery is a social activist from Africville, Nova Scotia. The small, mainly black community in Halifax was destroyed by the city in the 1960s as an "urban renewal" project, after years of neglect and poor services.

Carvery started his protest on the site in 1970. Carvery lived in what became known as Seaview Park on and off over a period of 25 years before making international news  when the G7 came to Halifax in 1995. The City of Halifax tried to evict Eddie and his brother Victor from Seaview Park.

The brothers eventually moved out of the park and onto adjacent land, continuing the protest where the village school once stood. The Carverys remained protesting on the grounds of Africville as of 2010. Eddie remains at his protest site behind the newly reconstructed Africville Church as of February 2012.

The Hermit of Africville, a biography of Eddie Carvery, was published by Pottersfield Press in 2010.

He was featured on the 2022 podcast Africville Forever.

References

Additional sources 
 "Eddie Carvery, Africville and the Longest Civil Rights Protest in Canadian History", Transmopolis, July 2010 (http://www.transmopolis.com/2010/07/africville/)
 "Seaview shame, suburban sprawl", The Coast newspaper, 2008 article (http://www.thecoast.ca/halifax/seaview-shame-suburban-sprawl/Content?oid=993663)

Black Nova Scotians
Canadian activists
People from Halifax, Nova Scotia
Living people
Year of birth missing (living people)